Jacques de Châtillon, lord of Dampierre (c. 1367 – 25 October 1415) was a French nobleman who served as Admiral of France from 1405 to 1415 under King Charles VI, until his death at the Battle of Agincourt.

References

Sources 

1360s births
1415 deaths
Admirals of France
French military personnel killed in action
French nobility
House of Châtillon
Place of birth missing